Ellingwood Point is a high mountain summit in the Sangre de Cristo Range of the Rocky Mountains of North America. Ellingwood Point was named in honor of Albert Russell Ellingwood, an early pioneer of mountain climbing in the Western United States and in Colorado in particular.

Mountain
Ellingwood Point only barely qualifies as an independent peak under the  topographic prominence cutoff which is standard in Colorado. It is also quite close to its parent peak, Blanca Peak. Hence its inclusion in fourteener lists has been somewhat controversial. However most authorities do consider it a true fourteener.

Names
Ellingwood Peak
Ellingwood Point – 1972

See also

List of mountain peaks of Colorado
List of Colorado fourteeners

References

External links

 
 

Mountains of Colorado
Mountains of Alamosa County, Colorado
Mountains of Huerfano County, Colorado
Rio Grande National Forest
San Isabel National Forest
Sangre de Cristo Mountains
Fourteeners of Colorado